The softball competition at the 2022 World Games took place from July 9–13, 2022, in Birmingham in United States, at the University of Alabama Birmingham. Originally scheduled to take place in July 2021, the Games were rescheduled for July 2022 as a result of the 2020 Summer Olympics postponement due to the COVID-19 pandemic. Softball will return to official programme of the World Games after nine years of absence.

Format
A total of eight teams are divided into two groups of four teams each. In each group, teams played against each other once in a single round-robin format, for a total of three matches per team. The top two of each of the two groups advanced to the knockout stage.

Qualification
Eight teams qualified, including United States, which, as host nation, qualifies automatically. Qualification places were primarily based on national softball ranking. The last berth was awarded at the European Softball Championship, which was scheduled to take place in 2020 but have been moved due to the COVID-19 pandemic.

Qualified teams

Notes

Competition schedule
The match schedule of the softball tournament was unveiled on 24 February 2022.

Squads

Group stage

Group A

Group B

Classification stage

Bracket

Seventh place play-off

Fifth place play-off

Knockout stage

Bracket

Semi-finals

Bronze medal match

Gold medal match

Medalists

See also
 Softball at the World Games

References

External links
 The World Games 2022
 World Baseball Softball Confederation

 
2022 World Games